Anna Maria  of Hesse-Kassel (27 January 1567, Kassel – 21 November 1626, Neunkirchen) was a princess of Hesse-Kassel by birth and by marriage Countess of Nassau-Saarbrücken.

Life 
Anna Maria was the eldest daughter of Landgrave William IV of Hesse-Kassel (1532–1592) from his marriage to Sabine (1549–1581), daughter of Duke Christopher of Württemberg.

She married on 8 June 1589 in Kassel Count Louis II of Nassau-Weilburg (1565–1627). He had met Anna Maria during his Grand Tour and had been well received by Anna Maria's father and her uncle Louis IV.  In 1590 the couple moved in with Louis's father, Albert in Ottweiler. In 1593 Louis took over the government in Nassau-Weilburg.

Anna Maria helped organize the poor relief and set up a court pharmacy.

In 1626 Anna Maria fled from the plague from Saarbrücken to Neunkirchen where she died of the plague.  Anna Maria was buried in the crypt of the collegiate church of St. Arnual in Saarbrücken.  A few years earlier, she had built an impressive tomb for three of her children and now she was buried in this tomb herself.

Offspring 
From her marriage with Louis, Anna Maria had the following children:
 William Louis (1590–1640), Count of Nassau-Saarbrücken
 married in 1615 princess Anna Amalia of Baden-Durlach (1595-1651)
 Anna Sabine (1591–1593)
 Albrecht (1593–1595)
 Sophie Amalie (1594–1612)
 Georg Adolf (1595–1596)
 Philipp (1597–1621)
 Luise Juliane (1598–1622)
 Moritz (1599–1601)
 Karl Ernst (1600–1604)
 Marie Elisabeth (1602–1626)
 married in 1624 Count Frederick X of Leiningen-Dagsburg (1593-1651)
 John (1603–1677), Count of Nassau-Idstein
 married firstly in 1644 Princess Magdalene Sibylle of Baden-Durlach (1605-1644)
 married secondly in 1646 Countess Anna of Leiningen (1625-1668)
 Dorothea (1605–1620)
 Ernest Casimir (1607–1655), Count of Nassau-Weilburg
 married in 1634 Countess Anna Maria of Sayn-Wittgenstein (1610-1656)
 Otto (1610–1632), Count of Nassau-Weilburg in Neuweilnau

References 
 Fried Köllner: Geschichte des vormaligen Nassau-sarbrück'schen Landes und seiner Regenten, p. 307

External links 
 Entry for Anna Maria on the  site
 

House of Hesse
1567 births
1626 deaths
Countesses of Nassau
Burials at Stiftskirche Sankt Arnual (Saarbrücken)
Daughters of monarchs